Blaenau Gwent is a constituency in South Wales, represented in the House of Commons of the UK Parliament since 2010 by Nick Smith of the Labour Party.

Constituency profile
Blaenau Gwent is a post-industrial area which formerly had significant coal and steel sectors.

History

Predecessor seats
Blaenau Gwent incorporates most of the area of Aneurin Bevan's old constituency and other areas as population expansion has been low or negative following the 1960s. The constituency was created in 1983, twenty-three years after Bevan's death, from the upper part of the former Abertillery constituency, the town of Brynmawr from Brecon and Radnor, and Bevan's old Ebbw Vale seat with the exception of the area of the Rhymney Community (formerly Rhymney Urban District). The then-Labour party leader Michael Foot, who had won Ebbw Vale in the by-election following Bevan's death, was the seat's first MP.

Strong Labour Party majorities
Until 2005, the constituency statistically ranked in the top 20 safest Labour seats in the country by size of majority and by continuous representation by candidates from that party.  In the 1983 and 1992 general elections, it was Labour's safest seat.

In the 2010 general election, Labour candidate Nick Smith gained the seat with a 29.2% swing from Independent back to Labour; as one of three seats Labour gained in that election where its government fell.  The 2015 result made the seat the 30th safest of Labour's 232 seats by percentage of majority.

Period of independent representation
At the 2005 general election the Labour Welsh Assembly Member Peter Law ran as an independent and won the seat. He had resigned from the Labour Party in protest at the imposition of an all-women candidates' shortlist following the retirement of incumbent MP Llew Smith, and overturned a 19,313 (60%) Labour majority with a significant 9,121 (25%) majority. In 2006 the Labour Party decided not to require an all-women shortlist at the next general election.

Law died of a brain tumour on 25 April 2006, prompting a by-election in the seat on 29 June. Labour failed to regain the seat as Law's former campaign manager, Dai Davies, was elected to replace him, beating Owen Smith, the Labour candidate who later became MP for Pontypridd.

Opposition parties
The Conservative Party and Liberal Democrats have both been very weak in the seat. From 1987 until 2017 neither had ever won 10% of the vote and the Conservatives had never achieved one eighth of the total votes cast. However, in 2015 the Conservatives achieved just under 15% of the vote, with Plaid Cymru in second place after Labour. In 2005 the Liberal Democrats received their lowest share of the vote in the United Kingdom and the Conservatives their second lowest, and both lost their deposits, though this particular election saw unusual circumstances.

The 2010 result was one of few where an Independent candidate kept their deposit, winning in excess of 5% of the votes cast, and pushed one of the main three parties into fourth place; the independent Blaenau Gwent People's Voice group fielded no candidate in 2015.  Three non-Labour candidates exceeded 5% of the vote (the deposit threshold) in 2015, the foremost locally being UKIP (who achieved nearly 18% of the vote), but the Lib Dem and Green candidates failed to retain their deposits.

Boundaries

The constituency boundaries are coterminous with those of Blaenau Gwent county borough. The main towns are Ebbw Vale, Abertillery, Brynmawr and Tredegar.

Members of Parliament

Elections

Elections in the 1980s

Elections in the 1990s

Elections in the 2000s

Elections in the 2010s

Of the 35 rejected ballots:
25 were either unmarked or it was uncertain who the vote was for.
9 voted for more than one candidate.
1 had writing or mark by which the voter could be identified.

Of the 84 rejected ballots:
44 were either unmarked or it was uncertain who the vote was for.
30 voted for more than one candidate.
10 had writing or mark by which the voter could be identified.
This was the largest decrease in the Plaid Cymru vote share at the 2019 general election.

See also
 Blaenau Gwent (Senedd constituency)
 List of parliamentary constituencies in Gwent
 List of parliamentary constituencies in Wales

Notes

References

External links
nomis Constituency Profile for Blaenau Gwent presenting data from the ONS annual population survey and other official statistics.
Election results, 1997 - 2001 (BBC)
Election results, 1997 - 2001  (Election Demon)
Election results, 1983 - 1992  (Election Demon)
Election results, 1992 - 2005 (Guardian)
Politics Resources (Election results from 1922 onwards)
Electoral Calculus (Election results from 1955 onwards)
2017 Election House Of Commons Library 2017 Election report
A Vision Of Britain Through Time (Constituency elector numbers)

Parliamentary constituencies in South Wales
Constituencies of the Parliament of the United Kingdom established in 1918
Constituencies of the Parliament of the United Kingdom established in 1983
Politics of Blaenau Gwent